The Early November is an American rock band from New Jersey, United States. The group formed in 2001 and signed with Drive-Thru Records in 2002. , they have released two EPs: For All of This (2002) and The Acoustic EP (2005). They have released five full-length albums: The Room's Too Cold (2003), triple album The Mother, the Mechanic, and the Path (2006), In Currents (2012), and Imbue (2015). Their most recent album, Twenty, was released October 14, 2022. The band is currently signed to Pure Noise Records.

History

Formation and For All of This EP (1999–2002)
The band was formed by singer and guitarist Arthur Enders, bassist Sergio Anello, drummer Jeff Kummer, and guitarist Jim Sacco in Hammonton, New Jersey. Together, they recorded a five-track demo in Enders' basement and sent it, along with a poorly edited videotape, to only one label, Drive-Thru Records.

Both Sacco and Anello left the band for personal reasons and were replaced by Steve Nakovich (guitar) and Mike Klemash (bass). The band got in touch with Drive-Thru founder Richard Reines, who agreed to meet with the band to give advice. Upon returning to California, Reines discussed a possible signing with Drive-Thru co-owner Stefanie Reines. During this time, there was another lineup change that saw Anello return to the band, replacing Klemash, and Joe Marro replacing Nakovich. A few weeks later, Drive-Thru signed The Early November and put them, despite their practically non-existent stage experience, on 2002's Skate and Surf Fest and on selected dates of the Warped Tour. In August, former members of the band, as well as the June Spirit, formed Finding Westerly.

Marro left the band before the recording of their debut EP For All of This and was replaced by John Dubitsky. The EP came out on Drive-Thru Records in December 2002. Enders recorded The Acoustic EP on his own, featuring acoustic versions of most songs off of their debut EP, releasing it two months later. Simultaneously, guitarist Marro re-joined the band in exchange for Dubitsky.

Early success and The Room's Too Cold (2003-2005)
In April and May 2003, the group went on a tour of the US with Brand New. Throughout 2003, the band continued to tour and write songs in preparation for their first full-length CD The Room's Too Cold, which was released in fall of that year. Soon afterwards, Enders recorded a solo record under the name I Can Make a Mess Like Nobody's Business. The CD was almost scrapped due to Enders wanting to focus on The Early November.

Triple disc album and hiatus (2006–2010)
During the recording process of their triple album, The Mother, The Mechanic, The Path, guitar tech Bill Lugg joined the band as a third guitarist.

The Mother, the Mechanic, and the Path was released on July 11, 2006. The album subsequently debuted at number 31 on the Billboard 200 for the week ending July 21. This was the band's highest charting album to date.

On March 13, 2007, The Early November posted an announcement on their website that they "will be taking an indefinite hiatus" following their last headlining tour with The Rocket Summer and Mêlée and The Verdict / Nothing Ever Stays and two farewell shows in April. The first night, the last song played was "I Want To Hear You Sad". On the second night, the last song played at their final headlining show at the Trocadero in Philadelphia, PA was "Truth Is". Their last show prior to the hiatus was played on May 6 at The Bamboozle festival in New Jersey. Kummer would go on to form the band Grace Period with his friends.

In May 2009, Kumer posted on his Twitter that he and Enders were going to discuss getting the band back together. One week later, Enders addressed the rumors, stating, "it seems like most of you understand now that Jeff's comment last week about the band getting back together wasn't true, but the responses I've seen got me thinking".

It was rumored that Enders and Anello were planning to play songs from The Early November on their band I Can Make a Mess Like Nobody's Business' tour in summer 2009, which subsequently turned out to be true.

Reunion and In Currents (2011-2012)
On June 22, 2011, Ace Enders and Jeff Kummer both announced that The Early November would be performing a concert at The Electric Factory in Philadelphia, PA on September 10. This was their first show together in 4 years and had sold out. Additionally, they added a concert at the Starland Ballroom on November 26. It was confirmed at this show that they were in the recording process of a new album at Enders' recording studio, The Living Room.

Two days later, it was announced that they had signed with Rise Records and would be releasing their first album in over six years sometime in Spring 2012. It was then announced on their website that the new album, titled In Currents was scheduled to be released on July 10th, 2012.

They performed at the South by So What Festival on March 12, 2012 and the Never Say Never music festival in south Texas March 13th.

On April 26, they announced that they would be releasing a rough mix of one of the songs from their upcoming album. The song, entitled "Close To You", was made available the following day on their website.

On June 7, their new single, "A Stain On The Carpet", was made available for online streaming exclusively on Spinner. Radio 104.5 in Philadelphia debuted the title cut "In Currents" on June 22.

The album was released on July 10 and debuted at number 43 on the Billboard 200.

Imbue and Lilac (2013-2021)
At their Room's Too Cold anniversary show at Bowery Ballroom in New York City on December 18, 2013, it was announced that they had been trying to keep quiet that they are working on a new album. They played a new song, titled "Better This Way", to start their second set.

On May 12, 2015, the band released their fourth studio album, Imbue. The album's first track "Narrow Mouth" was made available to stream online.

On June 25, the band was announced as support with Better Off for Bayside's B-market tour of the United States to occur from August 31 through September 18 with the tour concluding at Riot Fest in Toronto, Canada.

In July 2018, it was announced that their fifth studio album, titled Lilac, would be released in the fall. In November, the band Tweeted that the album was being pushed back to 2019.

In July 2019, the band announced Lilac will be released on September 27, 2019.

Twenty (2022–Present)
Their fifth record, Twenty, is an homage to their past and present. This record was released twenty years after their initial EP, For All of This. The tracks on this album are an homage to the band's early years. It was released October 14, 2022 via Pure Noise Records.

Members
Current
 Arthur "Ace" Enders – lead vocals, rhythm guitar (2001–2007; 2011–present), piano (2002–2007; 2011–present), lead guitar (2001–2002)
 Joseph Marro – keyboards, piano, backing vocals (2002–2007, 2011–present), rhythm guitar (2006–2007; 2011–present); lead guitar (2002–2006)
 Bill Lugg – lead guitar (2006–2007; 2011–present)
 Sergio Anello – bass (2001–2007; 2011–present)
 Jeff Kummer – drums, percussion (2001–2007; 2011–present)
 Nate Sander – drums, percussion (2011–present)

Former
 John Dubitsky – lead guitar (2001–2006)
 Steve Nakovich – keyboards, piano, backing vocals (2001–2002)
 Mike Klemash – bass (2001)
 Jim Sacco – drums, percussion (2001)

Timeline

Discography

Studio albums
 The Room's Too Cold (2003)
 The Mother, the Mechanic, and the Path (2006)
 In Currents (2012)
 Imbue (2015)
 Lilac (2019)
 Twenty (2022)

Compilation albums
 Fifteen Years (2017)

EPs
 For All of This (2002)
 The Acoustic EP (2003)
 The Early November/I Am the Avalanche (2005)

Non-album tracks
 "Power of Love" – released on Punk Goes 80's (2005)
 "5 Years" – released on copies of The Mother, the Mechanic, and the Path (2006) purchased at Target
 "Pretty Pretty" – released on Drive-Thru Records DVD
 "Just Enough" – released on Drive-Thru Records DVD, appears on The 5 Song EP
 "Open Eyes" – released on Drive-Thru Records DVD, appears on The 5 Song EP
 "Make Believe", "Achieving the Normal", and "For the Road" also appear on The 5 Song EP
 "Piano Song" – A b-side released on TEN's Myspace page in 2009

Demo albums
 The 5 Song EP
 So This is Fun?
 An Excellent Attempt at Next to Yousim

Other projects

Ace Enders
 I Can Make a Mess Like Nobody's Business
 Ace Enders and A Million Different People
 Clear Eyes Fanzine
 Aaron West and the Roaring Twenties

Jeff Kummer
 Man Overboard
 Your Sweet Uncertainty
 I Can Make A Mess Like Nobody's Business
 Jeff Kummer

Joseph Marro
 Joseph Marro and The Hum Drum
 Hellogoodbye (2008–2012)

Bill Lugg
 I Can Make A Mess Like Nobody's Business

Sergio Anello
 Everyone Knows
 Ace Enders and A Million Different People

References

External links

Emo musical groups from New Jersey
Indie rock musical groups from New Jersey
Musical groups established in 1999
Musical groups disestablished in 2007
Musical groups reestablished in 2011
Hammonton, New Jersey
Rise Records artists
Drive-Thru Records artists
Pure Noise Records artists